Justin Peters (born August 30, 1986) is a Canadian former professional ice hockey goaltender. He was selected in the second round, 38th overall, by the Carolina Hurricanes in the 2004 NHL Entry Draft. 

Peters played 83 career games for the Hurricanes, Washington Capitals and Arizona Coyotes.

Playing career
After playing Junior A hockey with the Vaughan Vipers of the Ontario Provincial Junior A Hockey League (OPJHL), Peters began a four-season Ontario Hockey League (OHL) career with the Toronto St. Michael's Majors and Plymouth Whalers. Peters scored an empty-net goal in Game 7 of the first-round of the 2004 OHL playoffs against the Sudbury Wolves while playing for the Majors. He was drafted in the second round, 38th overall, by the Carolina Hurricanes in the 2004 NHL Entry Draft, then began his professional career in 2006–07 with the Hurricanes' American Hockey League (AHL) affiliate, the Albany River Rats. He was demoted to the ECHL for parts of the 2007–08 season, but returned to the River Rats in 2008–09.

On February 5, 2010, the Carolina Hurricanes recalled Justin Peters from Albany after Cam Ward suffered an upper body injury. He made his NHL debut for the Hurricanes on February 6, 2010, starting against the New York Islanders; he made 34 saves in a 3–1 victory.

After eight seasons within the Hurricanes organization, Peters left as a free agent to sign a two-year contract with the Washington Capitals on July 1, 2015.

On July 1, 2016, Peters left the Capitals as a free agent and signed a one-year contract with the Arizona Coyotes. He was assigned to begin the 2016–17 season with the Coyotes' AHL affiliate, the inaugural Tucson Roadrunners. With the Coyotes impacted by an injury to starting goaltender Mike Smith, Peters was recalled and appeared in three games. While returned to the Roadrunners, Peters (along with Justin Hache) were traded to the Dallas Stars in exchange for Brendan Ranford and Branden Troock on February 1, 2017.

Having spent his first ten professional seasons in North America, on June 30, 2017, Peters signed a one-year deal with Latvian club Dinamo Riga of the Kontinental Hockey League (KHL). On October 18, 2017, signed a contract with Deutsche Eishockey Liga (DEL) side Kölner Haie of Germany.

Peters moved to Piráti Chomutov of the Czech Extraliga for the 2018-19 season. He then played for Bili Tygri Liberec and BK Mlada Boleslav the following season.

On February 5, 2021, Peters was hired by the Belleville Senators as a goaltending coach, effectively ending his professional career.

International play

On May 4, 2014, Peters was added to Canada's roster for the 2014 World Championship. Assuming the role as the team's third goaltender, Peters did not dress in the tournament.

On January 11, 2018, Peters was named to Canada's men's hockey team delegation to the 2018 Winter Olympics in Pyeonchang, South Korea, where they won the bronze medal.

Personal
Both of Peters' brothers play hockey. Anthony, a fellow goaltender, plays for Modo Hockey in HockeyAllsvenskan. Youngest brother Alexander was drafted by the Dallas Stars in the 2014 NHL Entry Draft and most recently played for Saint Mary's University.

Career statistics

Regular season and playoffs

References

External links
 

1986 births
Living people
Albany River Rats players
Arizona Coyotes players
Canadian ice hockey goaltenders
Carolina Hurricanes draft picks
Carolina Hurricanes players
Charlotte Checkers (2010–) players
Dinamo Riga players
Florida Everblades players
Hershey Bears players
Ice hockey people from Ontario
Kölner Haie players
Olympic ice hockey players of Canada
Ice hockey players at the 2018 Winter Olympics
Olympic bronze medalists for Canada
Medalists at the 2018 Winter Olympics
Olympic medalists in ice hockey
People from Huron County, Ontario
Piráti Chomutov players
Plymouth Whalers players
Texas Stars players
Toronto St. Michael's Majors players
Tucson Roadrunners players
Washington Capitals players
Canadian expatriate ice hockey players in the Czech Republic
Canadian expatriate ice hockey players in the United States
Canadian expatriate ice hockey players in Germany
Canadian expatriate ice hockey players in Latvia